Robert Lucius "Bob" Harrison, Jr. (August 8, 1937 – February 4, 2016) was an American football defensive lineman in the National Football League for the San Francisco 49ers, the Philadelphia Eagles, and the Pittsburgh Steelers.  He played college football at the University of Oklahoma and was drafted in the second round of the 1959 NFL Draft. Harrison died in 2016, aged 78.

References

1937 births
2016 deaths
American football defensive tackles
Oklahoma Sooners football players
Philadelphia Eagles players
Pittsburgh Steelers players
San Francisco 49ers players
All-American college football players
Washington Commandos coaches
People from Stamford, Texas